Death at Love House (a.k.a. The Shrine of Lorna Love) is a 1976 American made-for-television horror film directed by E.W. Swackhamer and starring Robert Wagner, Kate Jackson, Sylvia Sidney and Marianna Hill. The film aired on the ABC network on September 3, 1976.

Plot 
While on a tour in Hollywood, a young couple, Joel and Donna Gregory, arrive at the house of Lorna Love, an infamous actress who died in 1935. There, they meet with housekeeper Clara Josephs and agent Oscar Payne, to investigate the mystery behind Lorna and finish a book that they are writing on the actress, an interest that came out of the discovery that Joel's father was her lover. While staying at the mansion, strange incidents occur. The couple immediately notice a portrait of Lorna, painted by Joel's father, and shortly after, Donna catches a 1930s-dressed woman at the center-located shrine in the garden, wherein Lorna's embalmed body rests on permanent display.

At their first night, they are visited by Conan Carroll, a film director who directed Lorna in her first breakthrough film Gone of Desire. Conan claims that Lorna ruined his life, and that Joel Sr. was the only person ever to walk away from her, after telling her that she had no soul. He quickly wants to exit the mansion, leaving Joel and Donna with even more questions. As Conan leaves, he is attacked by an unknown creature, and falls in the fountain, in which he drowns following a heart attack. While processing this information, Donna finds a mysterious blade that was commonly used in witchcraft and one of her photos torn apart. Joel, meanwhile, tries to find out more on a locked room, and finds out through Clara that it was Joel Sr. and Lorna's bedroom.

Later that day, Joel and Donna visit Denise Christian, an aged actress and former rival of Lorna at a set for a commercial. Denise explains that Lorna tried to blackball her at every studio as soon as Denise became as big of a star as her. She continues to tell that she first met Joel Sr. at the studio - where Joel Sr. was working in the art department - and that Lorna stole him from her just to bug Denise. Denise concludes to reveal that Lorna contacted a healer for eternal beauty and youth, and could not sleep ever since: after Joel Sr. smashed all the mirrors and left, she lived in the spiritual world of the healer, "Father Eternal Fire."

Back at the mansion, Joel finds a book about witch spells, and becomes obsessed with Lorna, fantasizing about her. Moments later, the same man who scared Conan tries to murder Donna through carbon monoxide poisoning in a locked bathroom, and Joel and Clara are only just in time to save her. Donna initially insists on leaving, but decides to support her husband as he explains that he is near discovering Lorna's secrets and thus cannot leave yet. They next meet with Marcella Geffenhart, Lorna's self-proclaimed best friend. She tells them about "Father Eternal Fire", a spiritual man, though refuses to elaborate on the witchcraft blade that Donna found. After the conversation, Donna claims that Marcella is the woman who ran past Lorna's shrine on the first day of their arrival, and wants to continue meeting with Marcella. Joel, however, forbids her from doing so, explaining that Lorna deserves to have secrets.

That evening – in an obsessed rage - Joel breaks into Lorna's bedroom and reads about details of Joel Sr.'s affair with her. Donna, meanwhile, has again spotted the woman from day one and reaches out to Joel for help. The next morning, Donna pleads to leave, but Joel again protects Lorna and refuses to go. Donna then meets with Oscar who reveals that part of the healer's activities involved fire, and that her husband is not safe in the mansion. Donna hurries to save Joel, and finds a terrified Marcella at the mansion along with the witchcraft blade cut through a photo of her. As she looks around, she finds a rubber mask, a gray-hair wig and dress hanging on a hook, and realizes that "Clara Josephs" is actually a very much alive (and psychotic) Lorna Love. She rushes to save Joel, but he does not recognize her and instead turns to Clara/Lorna. While under her spell, Joel kisses her at the shrine and fire breaks out. Donna goes in to save Joel, and leaves Clara/Lorna to burn to death. The supposed body of Lorna in the shrine melts in the fire, revealing it to have been a wax figure all along. The mansion is finally closed for good and the Gregorys leave to return home.

Cast
 Robert Wagner as Joel Gregory (Jr. & Sr.)
 Kate Jackson as Donna Gregory
 Sylvia Sidney as Clara Josephs
 Marianna Hill as Lorna Love
 Joan Blondell as Marcella Geffenhart
 John Carradine as Conan Carroll
 Dorothy Lamour as Denise Christian 
 Bill Macy as Oscar Payne
 Joseph Bernard as Bus Driver
 John A. Zee as Eric Herman 
 Robert Gibbons as Director
 Al Hansen as Policeman
 Crofton Hardester as Actor in Film

References

External links

  
 

1976 television films
1970s crime films
1976 horror films
1976 films
American supernatural horror films
American horror television films
ABC network original films
Films set in Los Angeles
Films about witchcraft
Films produced by Aaron Spelling
Films scored by Laurence Rosenthal
Films directed by E. W. Swackhamer
1970s English-language films
1970s American films